Brachylia senegalensis is a moth in the family Cossidae. It was described by Yakovlev and Saldaitis in 2011. It is found in Senegal.

References

Natural History Museum Lepidoptera generic names catalog

Cossinae
Moths described in 2011
Moths of Africa